was a samurai during the Kamakura period and a gokenin of the Kamakura shogunate. He was the fourth son of Mōri Tsunemitsu, and grandson of Mōri Suemitsu, the founder of the Mōri clan. Mōri Tokichika became the head of the Mōri family in 1270.

See also
Mōri clan
Mōri Motonari
Miura clan
Minamoto no Yoritomo
Minamoto no Sanetomo

Notes

1341 deaths
Mōri clan